European route E 713 is a European B class road in France, connecting the cities Valence — Grenoble.

Route 
 
 Valence
 E711 Grenoble

External links 
 UN Economic Commission for Europe: Overall Map of E-road Network (2007)
 International E-road network

International E-road network
Roads in France